is a Japanese football player who currently plays for Vanraure Hachinohe in J3 League from 2023.

Club career

In 7 December 2022, Senoo joined to J3 club, Vanraure Hachinohe for upcoming 2023 season.

Career statistics

Last update: end of the 2022 season.

Reserves performance

References

External links

1996 births
Living people
Association football people from Mie Prefecture
Japanese footballers
J1 League players
J3 League players
Gamba Osaka players
Gamba Osaka U-23 players
AC Nagano Parceiro players
Gainare Tottori players
Vanraure Hachinohe players
Association football midfielders